Sepedon fuscipennis is a species of marsh fly (insects in the family Sciomyzidae).

References

External links

Sciomyzidae
Insects described in 1859